Kelly Summers is a Canadian ice hockey defenseman who is currently signed to the Nottingham Panthers of the EIHL. He was an All-American for Clarkson.

Playing career
Summers had a tremendous season of junior hockey as an 18-year old, averaging more than a point per game and helping the Carleton Place Canadians win the Fred Page Cup. After the season Summers was drafted by the Ottawa Senators in the NHL draft. He began attending Clarkson University that fall and debuted for the ice hockey team. Summers provided steady production from the blueline and improved each season in terms of his offensive numbers. For his senior season, Summers became one of the top players in college hockey, nearly doubling his point production and helping the Golden Knights reach the ECAC championship game. That season, Clarkson made the NCAA Tournament for the first time in decade and while their appearance was short-lived, it was a huge step for the program.

After graduating, Summers signed a contract with the ECHL's Adirondack Thunder and produced well as a rookie. Near the end of the year he signed a PTO (professional try-out) contract with the Belleville Senators but didn't play in any games for the squad. After resigning with Adirondack, Summers finally got a shot at the AHL when he was loaned to the Binghamton Devils for 9 games.

Summers' time in the minor leagues was cut short when the COVID-19 pandemic ended the 2019–20 season prematurely and then caused the following year to be delayed. 

Instead of waiting around for his chance to play, Summers travelled to Germany to play for ETC Crimmitschau, where he remained for two years - but sat out the 2021–22 season due to a shoulder injury.

On 12 July 2022, Summers was revealed to be the latest signing for the Nottingham Panthers.

Personal life
Summers' cousin Mike Sullivan also played college hockey. Coincidentally, he too played 4 years at Clarkson.

Career statistics

Regular season and playoffs

Awards and honors

References

External links

1996 births
Living people
Canadian ice hockey defencemen
Ice hockey people from Wisconsin
Sportspeople from Madison, Wisconsin
AHCA Division I men's ice hockey All-Americans
Clarkson Golden Knights men's ice hockey players
Adirondack Thunder players
Binghamton Devils players
ETC Crimmitschau players
Nottingham Panthers players
Ottawa Senators draft picks